Leštane is a suburban settlement of Belgrade, Serbia. It is located in the municipality of Grocka.

Location 
Leštane is located 15 km east of Belgrade, originally further away from the major roads. As the settlement expanded, it reached the both major Smederevski put and Kružni put roads and in the last decade expanded even further.

It is located on the mouth of the Kaluđerički potok into the Bolečica river. The name of the settlement is one of the variants for hazel grove in the Serbian language .

Population 
Leštane is one of the fastest growing suburbs of Belgrade, especially since the mid-1970s, experiencing an annual growth of over 10% in 1971-1981 period. It is still classified as a rural settlement (village) though agriculture is no longer an important branch of the economy. Population of Leštane:

 1971 - 1,484
 1981 - 4,019
 1991 - 6,681
 2002 - 8,492

Leštane is more populous than its municipal seat, Grocka. Thousands of people migrated to the settlement from southern Serbia and especially Kosovo and Metohija since 1970's and after exodus of Serbs from Kosovo and Goranci in 1999, new thousands settled in Leštane so it is estimated it might have reached up to 15,000 inhabitants today.

Living conditions and economy 
Like the most of the booming suburbs of Belgrade, Leštane has been expanding uncontrolled and without any urbanistic plans. This causes today's big communal problem the settlement is experiencing especially the sewage system, waterworks and transportation, as streets are curved, without any order and in many cases without pavement. All of this brings to the big problems in the settlement during rains.

Until the late 1970s and early 1980s the economy of Leštane was based mainly on agriculture, but since then, a boom in privately owned small companies boosted the economy and attracted new population to migrate to the settlement. Some major economic facilities are a shoe factory, outpost of the National Customs Service, construction company Geosonda and a power relay station, a major one for the eastern parts of Belgrade, which was severely damaged during the NATO bombing of Yugoslavia in 1999.

In the 2000s, the area from the crossroad of Smederevski put and Kružni put, along the Bolečica river is designed as industrial zone (Industrijska zona Leštane). So far, several hangars, construction and transportation companies, a parquetry factory and a few smaller facilities (medicine factory, etc.) have been established, while some large areas are in the process of construction.

A small open farmer's market developed in the 1980s along the Smederevski put, next to the Vinča community health center. It expanded a bit in time, but the communal situation surrounding the market worsened. In February 2019 it was announced that the new market will be built.

Novo Naselje 
Novo Naselje (Cyrillic: Ново Насеље; Serbian for new settlement) is the eastern extension of Leštane, located on the both Smederevski put and Kružni put roads. As its name says it, it is a new settlement, developing mostly since the 1990s, with many small workshops, groceries and residential houses. It connects, in urban sense, Leštane with Kaluđerica (and thus with Belgrade), Vinča and Boleč. In the 2000s, Leštane began expanding to the west, opposite of Novo Naselje, in the direction of Bubanj Potok.

References

Sources 
 Jovan Đ. Marković (1990): Enciklopedijski geografski leksikon Jugoslavije; Svjetlost-Sarajevo; 

Suburbs of Belgrade
Šumadija